Barbara Yasmin Cabrera (born 12 August 1996) is an Argentine fashion model and beauty pageant titleholder who was appointed Miss Universe Argentina 2022 and will represent Argentina at Miss Universe 2022.

Early life 
Barbara Cabrera was born and raised in Buenos Aires. She began her modeling career at the academy of the former model Anamá Ferreira and was selected at the age of 18 to represent the province of Buenos Aires in the Miss Universe Argentina 2018 pageant, remaining a finalist.

Career 
At age 20 she moved to Panama, where she joined the Panama Talents agency. She paraded in the fashion week in Panama 2017 and in different campaigns and parades in Latin America, returning to Argentina to join the agency Multitalent, being selected by the Catalan designer Custo Dalmau for the closing of the event "Custo Barcelona" in the framework of the New York Fashion Week 2020.

As a graphic model, she was on the cover of several magazines, such as Gente and Marie Claire, and has been chosen by designers such as Benito Fernandez, Natalia Antolín and Gabriel Lagger among others to participate in their fashion shows.

References 

Living people
Argentine female models
People from Buenos Aires
Miss Universe 2022 contestants
21st-century Argentine women
1996 births